Ernest Somers-Smith (8 November 1895 – 2 April 1950) was an English first-class cricketer whose career spanned a single week in 1921, during which he played twice for Worcestershire. He did very little in those games, making 2 and 22 against Essex at Leyton and then 2 and 7 against Derbyshire at Worcester.

He was born in Ecclesall, Sheffield and died aged 54 in Odsal, Bradford, Yorkshire. His name was registered at both birth and death as Ernest Somers Smith with no hyphen.

External links
 

1895 births
1950 deaths
English cricketers
Worcestershire cricketers
Cricketers from Sheffield
English cricketers of 1919 to 1945